Dallen Forrest Bounds (August 9, 1971 – December 23, 1999) was an American serial killer. After killing two acquaintances, he barricaded himself with two women and ultimately committed suicide. Law enforcement officers have closed four murders in the Greenville and Pickens counties of South Carolina, and officials in the state of Washington suspect he was involved in several other murders.

Murders 
 June 26, 1999 – Radio Shack employee Jonathan Lemuel Lara was restrained with flex ties to a chair in the back room of a Radio Shack in Greenville, South Carolina. Lara was stabbed in the neck with a screwdriver and subsequently died. Casandra Laster, Bounds' accomplice, was found guilty of accessory after the fact to felony murder in 2001. Laster appealed her sentence of 15 years but her appeal was dismissed in 2003 by the South Carolina Court of Appeals. Law enforcement had indicated to the court that she had not notified them of Bounds's involvement until after he killed himself in December 1999.
 December 22, 1999 – Bounds walked into a tiny flower shop on a busy street in broad daylight and killed the 30-year-old clerk, Karen Moore Hayden, leaving her face down in a back storage room in a pool of blood. The young wife and mother's body was found by a delivery man sent from the main Greenville-Pelham Florist Shop to check on her. He had to unlock the door to get inside after finding all of the store's lights turned off and the "Sorry, we're closed" sign hanging in the front window. Hayden's throat had been slit.
 December 23, 1999 – Bounds killed an acquaintance Sandi Roberts Ott and her ex-husband Timothy Ott in the ex-husband's home in Easley. Bounds fled the house and took refuge in a neighborhood several miles away, holding two women hostage. Bounds killed himself shortly thereafter with a gunshot to the head.

See also 
 List of serial killers in the United States
 List of serial killers by number of victims

References 

1971 births
1999 deaths
1999 murders in the United States
1999 suicides
20th-century American criminals
American serial killers
Criminals from Oregon
Male serial killers
People from Ashland, Oregon
Suicides by firearm in South Carolina